Artful is a 2012 novel by Scottish author Ali Smith and published by Hamish Hamilton. It was shortlisted for the inaugural Goldsmiths Prize in 2013.

Plot 
This book is based on four lectures given by Ali Smith at Oxford University, the Weidenfeld lectures on European comparative literature. The four headings are: "On Time", "On Form", "On Edge", and "On Offer and On Reflection".

It has two fictional characters. One is a woman mourning her dead lover and the other is her dead lover who still seems to be present. She speaks to the mourning woman in Greek, steals belongings, and causes a nuisance. The dead woman was working on some lectures when she died, and the living one works with trees.

The English author and critic Julie Myerson wrote in the Guardian that "if this book has a central subject, it's the relationship between thought and art". 

Smith explores different artists throughout the book including the surrealists, William Shakespeare, and Jackie Kay.

Reception 
The Independent called the novel "smart, allusive, informal, playful, and audacious". The Guardian said the novel is "a seductive and compelling case for the power of imagination".

References 

Scottish literature
2012 British novels
Hamish Hamilton books